The Associação Maritima e Colonial (Maritime and Colonial Association) of Portugal formed in 1839. In the 1840s it issued a monthly journal, Annaes Maritimos e Coloniaes.

References

Bibliography
 . 1840-
 

1839 establishments in Portugal
Non-profit organisations based in Portugal
Portuguese Empire
Defunct organisations based in Portugal